The Louvain method for community detection is a method to extract communities from large networks created by Blondel et al. from the University of Louvain (the source of this method's name). The method is a greedy optimization method that appears to run in time  where  is the number of nodes in the network.

Modularity optimization
The inspiration for this method of community detection is the optimization of modularity as the algorithm progresses. Modularity is a scale value between −0.5 (non-modular clustering) and 1 (fully modular clustering) that measures the relative density of edges inside communities with respect to edges outside communities. Optimizing this value theoretically results in the best possible grouping of the nodes of a given network. But because going through all possible iterations of the nodes into groups is impractical, heuristic algorithms are used.

In the Louvain Method of community detection, first small communities are found by optimizing modularity locally on all nodes, then each small community is grouped into one node and the first step is repeated. The method is similar to the earlier method by Clauset, Newman and Moore that connects communities whose amalgamation produces the largest increase in modularity.

Algorithm
The value to be optimized is modularity, defined as a value in the range  that measures the density of links inside communities compared to links between communities. For a weighted graph, modularity is defined as:

where
  is the sum of all of the edge weights in the graph;
  is Kronecker delta function ( if ,  otherwise).

Based on the above equation, the modularity of a community  can be calculated as:

where
  is the sum of edge weights between nodes within the community  (each edge is considered twice); and
  is the sum of all edge weights for nodes within the community (including edges which link to other communities).

In order to maximize modularity efficiently, the Louvain Method has two phases that are repeated iteratively.

First, each node in the network is assigned to its own community. The two equations are quite similar, and the equation for step (2) is:

Then, once this value is calculated for all communities  is connected to,  is placed into the community that resulted in the greatest modularity increase. If no increase is possible,  remains in its original community. This process is applied repeatedly and sequentially to all nodes until no modularity increase can occur. Once this local maximum of modularity is hit, the first phase has ended.

In the second phase of the algorithm, it groups all of the nodes in the same community and builds a new network where nodes are the communities from the previous phase. Any links between nodes of the same community are now represented by self-loops on the new community node and links from multiple nodes in the same community to a node in a different community are represented by weighted edges between communities. Once the new network is created, the second phase has ended and the first phase can be re-applied to the new network.

Previous uses
Twitter social Network (2.4 Million nodes, 38 million links) by Josep Pujol, Vijay Erramilli, and Pablo Rodriguez: The authors explore the problem of partitioning Online Social Networks onto different machines.
Mobile phone Network (4 Million nodes, 100 Million links) by Derek Greene, Donal Doyle, and Padraig Cunningham: Community-tracking strategies for identifying dynamic communities of different dynamic social networks.
Detecting species in network-based dynamical model.

Comparison to other methods
When comparing modularity optimization methods, the two measures of importance are the speed and the resulting modularity value. A higher speed is better as it shows a method is more efficient than others and a higher modularity value is desirable as it points to having better-defined communities.
The compared methods are, the algorithm of Clauset, Newman, and Moore, Pons and Latapy, and Wakita and Tsurumi.

-/- in the table refers to a method that took over 24hrs to run. This table (from) shows that the Louvain method outperforms many similar modularity optimization methods in both the modularity and the time categories.

See also
 Modularity (networks)
 Community structure
 Network science
 K-means clustering

References

"The Louvain method for community detection in large networks" Vincent Blondel http://perso.uclouvain.be/vincent.blondel/research/louvain.html

Network theory